Kommissar Freytag is a German television series.

See also
List of German television series

External links
 

German crime television series
1963 German television series debuts
1966 German television series endings
German-language television shows
Das Erste original programming
1960s German police procedural television series